"Mi Gente" (English: My People) is a song by Latin salsa star Héctor Lavoe from the album, La Voz.  It is considered by many Latinos to be his signature song.  The most popular version of the song was recorded in 1974 in Africa with the Fania All Stars.

The song was composed by Johnny Pacheco.

Marc Anthony version

"Mi Gente" is a cover of Héctor Lavoe's song by Marc Anthony for the movie El Cantante as he plays Lavoe himself. The song was featured on Gloria Estefan's Mexican promo single of No Llores. The song received a nomination at the 2008 Latin Billboard Music Awards for "Tropical Airplay Song Of The Year".

Chart position

Other Covers
 Domingo Quiñones covered the song on his tribute album, "¿Quién Mató a Héctor Lavoe?".
 Angel & Khriz covered "Mi Gente" while using Hector Lavoe's recorded voice. It was included as part of the Urban Tribute to Hector Lavoe.

References

External links
 A Man And His Music | Fania

1973 songs
2007 singles
Salsa songs
Héctor Lavoe songs
Marc Anthony songs
Puerto Rican songs
Songs about Puerto Rico
Song recordings produced by Sergio George